John William (Wee Willie) Sudhoff (September 17, 1874 – May 25, 1917) was a starting pitcher in Major League Baseball who played in the National League for the St. Louis Browns (1897–1898), Cleveland Spiders (1899), St. Louis Perfectos (1899) and St. Louis Cardinals (1900–1901), and with the St. Louis Browns (1902–1905) and Washington Senators (1906) of the American League. Sudhoff batted and threw right-handed. He was born in St. Louis, Missouri.

Predictably, Sudhoff created a controversy when he jumped from the National League Cardinals to the American League Browns, becoming the first to play for all St. Louis clubs. At , 165 lb he was a consistent pitcher who averaged 247 innings and 24 complete games in eight full seasons, with career-highs of 315 and 35 in 1898. He was at his best in 1903, going 21–15 with a 2.27 earned run average and five shutouts. His highlights include a pitching duel with Chief Bender of the Philadelphia Athletics in 1904, during ten innings, without either team scoring. The game ended in a scoreless tie after being suspended by poor light conditions.

In his ten-season career, Sudhoff had a 103–135 record with 520 strikeouts and a 3.56 ERA in 2086.1 innings.

Sudhoff died in St. Louis, Missouri at age 42.

See also
 List of St. Louis Cardinals team records
 List of Major League Baseball career hit batsmen leaders

External links
Baseball Almanac
Baseball Library
Baseball Reference
Biography written by Craig Carter
 

Cleveland Spiders players
St. Louis Browns players
St. Louis Browns (NL) players
St. Louis Cardinals players
St. Louis Perfectos players
Washington Senators (1901–1960) players
Major League Baseball pitchers
19th-century baseball players
Baseball players from St. Louis
1874 births
1917 deaths
Paducah Little Colonels players